Svalbardposten, founded in 1948, is a Norwegian weekly paper and online newspaper. It operates from Longyearbyen in Svalbard, Norway, and is published every Friday. It is the northernmost regularly published newspaper in the world. In 2014, it had a circulation of 2,636 copies every week.

The newspaper today 
The newspaper was printed by a printing press in Svalbard until 1996, which explains the paper's A4 format. Today, the newspaper is printed in Tromsø, Norway. Svalbardposten has been awarded the Local Newspaper of the Year Award three times, most recently in 2010. The award is handed out by the LLA, the organisation of local newspapers in Norway.

The history 
Svalbardposten started more or less as a wall poster, normally with four pages. The paper was hung up on the buildings where the coal miners were living. In the beginning the paper was described as "sometimes funny", but with "little information and seriousness". Throughout the years, the newspaper gradually became more professional. In the first years, the newspaper was published from September to May, but from 1986, Svalbardposten was published every Friday the whole year. After some economically tough years in the 1980s, the Norwegian Ministry of Justice intervened to save the paper. A foundation, Stiftelsen Svalbardposten, was established in 1992. The foundation now owns the newspaper, while a joint-stock company, Svalbardposten AS, publishes the newspaper.

In 1997, Svalbardposten launched its own website. Since September 2012, the readers need a subscription to read the news on the website.

References

External links
Official Site

Newspapers published in Norway
Foundations based in Norway
Companies based in Svalbard
Longyearbyen
Mass media in Svalbard
1948 establishments in Norway